Macquarie Boys' Technology High School was a high school for boys in Parramatta, New South Wales, Australia.

History
The former Macquarie Boys’ Technology High School location developed from a school located on a site in Macquarie Street, Parramatta. That site is currently occupied by Parramatta High School and Arthur Phillip High School. Post-primary schooling for boys was provided for on that site by the Boys' Department of Parramatta District School. The Boys’ Department of that school became known as Parramatta Commercial School and in 1920 was called Parramatta Intermediate High School. The title was changed to Parramatta Junior High School in January 1944 and a separate school was formed, still on the same site, with a separate principal.

In 1955 the name was changed to Macquarie Boys’ High School. At the end of 1957 the school moved to its current site on the corner of Kissing Point Road and what was then called Rydalmere Avenue, which was later absorbed into James Ruse Drive. In 1989 the word 'Technology' was added to the school's name.

At the beginning of 2008, Years 7 through to 10 were discontinued, while remaining Year 11 and 12 students completed their NSW Higher School Certificate course.

Principals
 Cecil Prestonappointed in January 1944 as Principal of Parramatta Junior High School; retired in November 1951
 William E. Gollanappointed as Principal of Parramatta Junior High School in January 1952. Became the first principal of Macquarie Boys' High School and established this school on the current site. He retired in March 1965
 Richard E. Willockappointed in 1965; transferred to Parramatta High School at the end of 1972
 George Douglas Heardappointed in January 1973; transferred to Model Farms High School at the end of 1977
 Arthur T. Howlandappointedin January 1978; retired at the end of 1982
 Geoffrey Bartlettappointed in January 1983; transferred to Cumberland High School at the end of 1985
 Trevor W. Taylorappointed in January 1986; retired in July 1993
 Geoffrey J. Hoganappointed in January 1994
 Jack McBrideappointed in 2005
 Fenahsi Kerimappointed in 2008

School closure
According to Nine News and The Daily Telegraph the school was to be shut down at the end of the 2009 school year because of major reputation problems throughout the school's history and the low numbers of students they had in 2007. This has subsequently been confirmed by the New South Wales Department of Education and Training.

The future
The school was planned to be rejuvenated as the Lachlan Macquarie College, which was to begin operating on school grounds in January 2008. This new college was intended to specialise in Maths and Science. As of 2015, the Parramatta Sun reported that the University of Western Sydney decided not to take up the lease and turn the school into the Lachlan Macquarie College, leaving the buildings of this school to be overtaken with graffiti and vandalism as a result. The New South Wales Department of Education and Training was looking at selling the site, considered surplus to its needs.

All buildings on site were completely demolished in late August 2018 to make way for eleven residential and three commercial blocks, accommodating up to 6,200 people.

Damage by fires 
Late in the night of 23 July 2016, a "suspicious" fire gutted the school's vacant main hall. Fire fighters were able to control the spread of the fire, but the main building appeared to be totally destroyed. Officials issued a call for leads into who may have started the fire. On 20 May 2017, another fire occurred. On 27 April 2018, a small fire was lit in one of the first buildings.

See also
 List of government schools in New South Wales

References

External links
 https://web.archive.org/web/20080918014852/http://macquarieboys.com.au/

Defunct public high schools in Sydney
Defunct boys' schools in Australia
Schools in Parramatta
Educational institutions disestablished in 2010
2010 disestablishments in Australia
Educational institutions established in the 1920s
1920s establishments in Australia